Monanthesia is an extinct genus of bennettitalean plant that is known from fossil finds in Europe and North America, which existed during the Early Cretaceous period.

Species
At least three species have been named:
Monanthesia saxbyana 
Monanthesia magnifica
Monanthesia gigantea

References

Bennettitales
Early Cretaceous plants
Prehistoric plant genera
Early Cretaceous life of North America
Cretaceous life of Europe
Fossil taxa described in 1934
Prehistoric plants of North America